Mesyagutovo (Mäsäğüt) is a rural locality (a selo) and the administrative center of Duvansky District of the Republic of Bashkortostan, Russia, located on the Ay River. Population:

References

Notes

Sources

Rural localities in Duvansky District
Ufa Governorate